The Latent Heterosexual is a play by Paddy Chayefsky. The author would not permit it to be performed on Broadway, but it opened at the Dallas Theater Center in March 1968, directed by Burgess Meredith, with a cast that included Zero Mostel and Jules Munshin.

References

1968 plays
Plays by Paddy Chayefsky